San Juan Capistrano station is a train station in San Juan Capistrano, California, United States served by Amtrak, the national railroad passenger system, and Metrolink, a commuter railroad. The station has a single side platform serving the single track of the SCRRA's Orange Subdivision.

The station is served by Amtrak's Pacific Surfliner, and with few exceptions is the last stop in Orange County; a few trains stop at San Clemente Pier before crossing into San Diego County. It is also served by Metrolink's Orange County Line and Inland Empire-Orange County Line. Amtrak's ridership at the station dropped 53.4% to 90,699 in 2020, largely due to complications of the COVID-19 pandemic and two stay at home orders issued by California Governor Gavin Newsom.

Hours and frequency

History
The San Juan Capistrano station was originally opened October 27, 1894 by the Atchison, Topeka and Santa Fe Railway. It was one of the earliest examples of Mission Revival Style architecture in railway stations. In 1966, the station was closed, two years ahead of the end of Santa Fe passenger service to the city. Amtrak added San Juan Capistrano as a flag stop on its Los Angeles–San Diego San Diegan service on May 19, 1974. A year later, the depot was converted into a restaurant, with vintage rolling stock used to expand the space. Orange County Commuter service terminated here starting on April 30, 1990, and that service was conveyed to Metrolink when the Orange County Line opened on March 28, 1994. In 1995, the complex received a refurbishment, resulting in two restaurants, one located in the depot building, as well as Amtrak ticketing services and a waiting room, located in two boxcars.

The station serviced 237,776 passengers in 2018.

References
Notes

Bibliography

External links

San Juan Capistrano Amtrak-Metrolink Station(USA RailGuide -- TrainWeb)

Mission Revival architecture in California
Amtrak stations in Orange County, California
Metrolink stations in Orange County, California
Former Atchison, Topeka and Santa Fe Railway stations in California
San Juan Capistrano, California
Railway stations in the United States opened in 1894
1894 establishments in California
Railway stations closed in 1966
1966 disestablishments in California
1974 establishments in California
Railway stations in the United States opened in 1974